Joseph Schmidt (born November 2, 1998) is an American soccer player who plays as a defensive midfielder for USL Championship club Charleston Battery.

Playing career

Youth, college and amateur
Schmidt attended high school at University School, also playing four seasons of club soccer with Cleveland Internationals, captaining the U16 and U18 teams. He was also a member of the United States under-14 and under-15 youth national teams. In 2011, Schmidt briefly trained with the A.C. Milan Youth Sector.

In 2017, Schmidt attended Indiana University Bloomington to play college soccer. He redshirted his freshman season in 2017 before going on to make 73 appearances for the Hoosiers, scoring three goals and tallying nine assists from the defensive midfield role. He helped Indiana make runs to the College Cup in 2018 and 2020, ending the latter as national runner-up after advancing to the national championship game. He captained the Hoosiers during his senior year.

While in college, Schmidt was on the roster of National Premier Soccer League side Cleveland SC during their 2018 season, but didn't make an appearance due to injury.

Professional
On February 24, 2022, Schmidt signed with USL Championship club Charleston Battery. He made his professional debut on March 12, appearing as a 70th-minute substitute in a 1–0 victory over FC Tulsa.

Career statistics

References

External links

 Charleston profile
 
 

1998 births
Living people
American soccer players
Soccer players from Ohio
People from Geauga County, Ohio
Association football midfielders
Indiana Hoosiers men's soccer players
Cleveland SC players
Charleston Battery players
USL Championship players